Lindy is an opera in two acts by Australian composer Moya Henderson to an English libretto by Judith Rodriguez. It is based on the death of Lindy and Michael Chamberlain's baby Azaria Chamberlain in the Australian outback at Uluru in 1980.

The opera lasts for about 1 hour and 35 minutes. It premiered on 25 October 2002 at the Sydney Opera House.

Roles

Recording
The performances of 31 October and 2 November were used for the
CD recording by ABC Classics (Cat: 476 7489, UPC Number: 028947674894).

References

External links
Background & history of the work: 
Critical review: 
Critical review: 

Operas by Moya Henderson
English-language operas
2002 operas
Operas
Operas set in Australia
Opera world premieres at Sydney Opera House
Operas set in the 20th century
Operas based on real people
Cultural depictions of Australian men
Cultural depictions of Australian women